John Bender may refer to:

 John Bender (fl. 1870s), American serial killer among Bloody Benders
 John R. Bender (1882–1928), American football player and coach, basketball coach, baseball coach
 Jonathan Bender (born 1981), basketball player
 John Bender (Ohio politician), member of the Ohio House of Representatives from 1993 to 2000
 John Bender, a fictional character in the film The Breakfast Club
 John Bender (gridiron football) (born 1987), Canadian football offensive lineman
 Jack Bender (born 1949), American television and film director, actor, television producer, and writer